Barton Robert Johnson (born December 13, 1970), is an American actor, best known for his role as Coach Jack Bolton in the High School Musical film series. He was exposed to the TV and film industry at a young age and began his career in the mid-1990s. His film debut was My Family in 1995. He has also appeared in recurring roles on TV shows Hyperion Bay, Lifetime's The Client List, and Hawaii Five-0. He is married to actress Robyn Lively, with whom he has appeared in Gortimer Gibbon's Life on Normal Street. He also appeared in the 2018 adaptation of Little Women.

Early life 

Johnson was born in Hollywood, California, one of seven children. Their mother Charlene Johnson is a television hairstylist, and so Bart spent much of his early childhood on television sets such as The Brady Bunch, Mork and Mindy, and Charlie's Angels. At the age of 15, he moved from California to Utah, where he graduated from Wasatch High School. His family converted a flour mill near Park City, Utah into the Johnson Mill Bed & Breakfast, which Johnson later purchased from his parents. His first acting experience was a production of West Side Story. Johnson attended college at the University of Utah as a pre-med student before deciding to transfer to Yale University's drama program.

Career 
Johnson's first appeared in film with My Family in 1995. He then had guest roles on the following TV shows: Diagnosis Murder (1995), Walker, Texas Ranger (1997), Sunset Beach (1997), Jag (1997, 2004), and Babylon 5 (1998). From 1998 to 1999, he appeared on The WB's television show Hyperion Bay as local bully Nelson Tucker.

He is well-known for his role as the High School Musical series' Coach Jack Bolton, father of star player Troy Bolton (Zac Efron). He was invited to audition by director Kenny Ortega, who became a family friend after Johnson's mother's work as a hair stylist on the set of Newsies. Ortega persuaded executives to accept Johnson for the role after he auditioned with little background knowledge on his role.

Johnson had a recurring role on the TV series The Client List for Lifetime as Beau Berkhalter as well as on Gortimer Gibbon's Life On Normal Street for Amazon, alongside his wife Robyn Lively and their three children. He starred in a Hallmark movie, The Christmas Spirit, alongside Nicollette Sheridan. Johnson also appeared in the 2013 vampire comedy Vamp U. He portrayed Senator Gordon H. Smith in The Saratov Approach, a film based on the 1998 kidnapping of LDS missionaries in Saratov, Russia. He has worked on multiple projects with his brothers, including a short film about the brothers' adventures in Mexico entitled "The Run," as well as "Waffle Street," an independent movie filmed in Lehi, Utah. He appeared alongside wife Robyn Lively and actress Katee Sackhoff in the independent film Lockdown (later renamed A Deadly Obsession) in 2011. In 2018, he played Papa March in a modern-day adaptation of Little Women. In 2020, he appeared as Siena Agudong's character's father on Hawaii Five-0.

Johnson is the owner of the Johnson Mill Bed & Breakfast in Midway, Utah, near Park City, Utah. According to a 2008 website article WorkHomeYou.com, Redbook determined it to be one of the four most romantic in the country. In 2012, it was awarded the AAA Four Diamond Award. Johnson converted the bed and breakfast into a treatment center for those recovering from drug addictions.

Personal life

Johnson's brothers, Adam and Brad, also work in film. He is married to actress Robyn Lively, sister of actresses Blake Lively and Lori Lively and actors Eric Lively and Jason Lively. Bart and Robyn have three children: daughter Kate and sons Baylen and Wyatt Blake. In 2019, he accompanied his son Baylen on a humanitarian trip to Samoa, where they joined a group of youth to build a classrooms for two weeks.  He and wife Robyn Lively are practicing members of the Church of Jesus Christ of Latter-day Saints.

Filmography

References

External links 
Bart Johnson on Rotten Tomatoes
 

1970 births
American male television actors
Male actors from California
Bart
Aviators from California
Living people